Ilka Grüning (born Ilka Henriette Grunzweig; 4 September 1876 – 11 November 1964) was an Austrian-Hungarian actress. Born in Vienna in the old Austrian-Hungarian Empire, she was one of many Jewish actors and actresses that were forced to flee Europe when the Nazis came to power in 1933. A respected and famous actress of her time in the German-language area, she was forced to play bit parts in Hollywood.

Career

German career 
At age 17, Ilka Grüning made her stage debut in Miss Julie and quickly became a famous stage actress. Grüning's first film, at age 43, was a German silent movie called Todesurteil in 1919. Next, she starred with Conrad Veidt in Peer Gynt. Later that year, she and Veidt appeared in Die sich verkaufen.
          
She continued making silent movies in Germany into the 1920s. In 1920, she appeared in the film Die Bestie im Menschen based on the novel La Bête humaine by Émile Zola. This were two of 11 films she appeared in that year. Grüning appeared in Veidt's two Christian Wahnschaffe movies: Weltbrand in 1920 and Die Flucht aus dem goldenen Kerker in 1921. In 1922, she had a small part as a landlady in Lady Hamilton starring Veidt as Lord Horatio Nelson. This was one of four movies that she and Hans Twardowski appeared in together; F.W. Murnau's drama Phantom, Es leuchtet meine Liebe and The False Dimitri.

In 1923, she portrayed Frau Gött in Max Mack's The Beautiful Girl. Later that year, she portrayed the wife of Johann Friedrich Schiller in Friedrich Schiller - The Young Poet. Next she played Rosalindes' mother in Max Mack's Die Fledermaus (this was the 5th film she did with the German director). In 1924, she appeared in F.W. Murnau's drama The Grand Duke's Finances; (this was the third film she made with Murnau, the legendary German director).
          
In 1925, Grüning appeared in the silent Joyless Street, directed by the legendary Georg Wilhelm Pabst, which featured a 20-year-old Greta Garbo. The following year, Grüning appeared in her third Pabst' movie Secrets of a Soul. In 1927, Grüning appeared in Hello Caesar! which S.Z. Sakall helped write. Later that year, she and Sakall appeared together in Family Gathering in the House of Prellstein.
          
In 1929, Grüning appeared in her first 'talkie', Melody of the Heart. It would be three years before she appeared in another film. In 1932, she received a part in Max Neufeld's , which would be her last movie in Germany.   It would be nine years before she appeared in another movie.

American career 
Grüning, had played Strindberg and Ibsen for German director Max Reinhardt and had run the second most important drama school in Berlin, left 1938 Germany after Hitler and the Nazis came to power. After arriving in America in february 1939, she received help from the European Film Fund in resettling to America.

Sometime in the 1930s, she left Germany for Paris, France, and, in 1939, sailed from LeHavre on the S/S Paris, arriving at the Port of New York on February 8, 1939. It was her first time in America. With the outbreak of World War II and the need for older German women for war movies, Grüning started receiving parts. Her first Hollywood movie was in 1941 as Erwin Kalser's husband in Warner Bros.' war drama Underground starring Philip Dorn and Martin Kosleck (as the evil Nazi Colonel Heller) and Ludwig Stössel (who would play her husband in Casablanca).
          
Grüning was busy in 1942. First, Grüning (playing Anna) and Stössel appeared in the Oscar-nominated Kings Row starring Ronald Reagan, Ann Sheridan and Claude Rains. She then played Christian Rub's wife in the spy thriller Dangerously They Live starring Nancy Coleman and Raymond Massey. This was followed by playing the wife of Karl Pfeiffer, a German millionaire living in America (played by Charles Winninger) in Friendly Enemies. Grüning (playing Aunt Sophie) and Stössel appeared together again in a Sonja Henie film Iceland (film). Next, playing a Gestapo impostor, she appeared in Desperate Journey with Ronald Reagan and Errol Flynn.

         
Also in 1942, at the age of 66, Grüning received the role of Mrs. Leuchtag, who along with her husband (played by Ludwig Stössel) are leaving Europe for America in Casablanca. She has only one scene (a total of 30 words) in the movie when she and her husband are having a drink in Rick's Cafe with their good friend Carl the waiter (S. Z. Sakall) and struggling a bit with their English. Her husband (Ludwig Stössel) asks her for the time, "Liebchen – sweetnessheart, what watch?" She answers, "Ten watch" and he replies, "Such much?" Carl assures them they will get along beautifully in America.

In 1943, Grüning received a bit part as George Tobias's mother in This Is the Army. Next she appeared in The Strange Death of Adolf Hitler with Stössel and Twardowski. Grüning received bit parts in Madame Curie starring Greer Garson and Walter Pidgeon (as the Curies). Grünig appeared in only one movie in 1944 as Mrs. Vronsky in the drama An American Romance starring Brian Donlevy, Ann Richards, and John Qualen. Grüning would not get another part until 1946 when she received a bit part in the mystery Murder in the Music Hall. She received a couple of other small parts that year; the first as Herman Bing's wife in Rendezvous 24.
          
Next Grüning and Stössel got to play husband and wife again. Instead of being the Leuchtags, they were now the Muellers in Temptation starring Merle Oberon, George Brent and Paul Lukas. The following year, she played Paul E. Burns's wife in the film-noir Desperate which featured Raymond Burr. Playing Mattie, she appeared next in Repeat Performance. In 1948 appeared in Letter from an Unknown Woman starring Joan Fontaine. Later she played a German woman in Billy Wilder's comedy romance A Foreign Affair starring Marlene Dietrich. She also had a small part in the M-G-M musical Words and Music.
          
The following year, she played a grandmother in the film-noir Caught starring James Mason and Barbara Bel Geddes. Later that year, Grüning and Stössel appeared in their last film together when they received roles in the drama The Great Sinner starring Gregory Peck and Ava Gardner. She played another old woman in Mr. Soft Touch with Glenn Ford.

In 1950, she received a good part as Edgar Bergen's wife in the adventure film Captain China starring John Payne and Gail Russell. She had another good role in the film-noir Convicted starring Glenn Ford and Broderick Crawford. The following year, she appeared as Brett King's mother in Payment on Demand with Bette Davis. Her last Hollywood movie was as Mama Ludwig, Griff Barnett's wife, in the western Passage West starring John Payne.

 Short Return to Germany 
Like many German and Austrian actors, Grüning went back to Berlin in the 1950s, but found that Germany was not the same country she had left. Many former Nazis returned and it became difficult for Grüning to integrate back into the film industry. She did, at age 76, appear in a small Swiss movie in 1952 called , which was her last movie. After this Grüning returned to America.

Death
Grüning died on November 11, 1964, in Los Angeles, at the age of  88. She was cremated and her ashes rest at Woodlawn Memorial Cemetery, Santa Monica, California.

Selected filmography

 Peer Gynt – 2. Teil: Peer Gynts Wanderjahre und Tod (1919) – Aase
 Peer Gynt (1919) – Aase
 Pogrom (1919) – Wera Cheberiak
 Prostitution (1919)
 Rose Bernd (1919) – Frau Flamm
 Todesurteil (1919)
 Der Sklave seiner Leidenschaft (1920)
 Monika Vogelsang (1920) – Witwe Walterspiel
 Mary Magdalene (1920) – Ehefrau von Meister Anton
 Das Grauen (1920) – Mutter Claar
 Eine Demimonde-Heirat (1920) – Anuschka
 Können Gedanken töten? (1920) – Bäuerin
 The Prisoner (1920)
 The Marriage of Figaro (1920) – Marcelline
 Fanny Elssler (1920)
 Der Abenteurer von Paris (1920)
 Catherine the Great (1920)
 Christian Wahnschaffe (1920)
 Menschen (1920)
 Die Bestie im Menschen (1920)
 Hannerl and Her Lovers (1921)
 The Conspiracy in Genoa (1921) – Matrone
 Die Diktatur der Liebe, 2. Teil – Die Welt ohne Liebe (1921) – Ihre Mutter
 Die große und die kleine Welt (1921) – Frau aus dem Volke
 Aus den Tiefen der Großstadt (1921)
 About the Son (1921)
 The Fateful Day (1921) – Gräfin
 The Stranger from Alster Street (1921)
 Trix, the Romance of a Millionairess (1921)
 The Inheritance of Tordis (1921) – seine Frau
 Seafaring Is Necessary (1921)
 Der Leidensweg eines Achtzehnjährigen (1921)
 Memoirs of a Film Actress (1921)
 The Story of Christine von Herre (1921) – Die alte Comtesse
 Lady Hamilton (1921) – Eine Wirtin
 Das zweite Leben (1921)
 Die Schuldige (1921) – Gräfin Wuthenow
 Lotte Lore (1921)
 Die Geheimnisse von Berlin, 3. Teil – Berlin-Moabit. Hinter Gitterfenstern (1921)
 Die Kreutzersonate (1922) – Frau Suchoff
 Die Dame und der Landstreicher (1922)
 Die siebtente Nacht (1922) – Frau Freese
 Aus den Erinnerungen eines Frauenarztes – 2. Lüge und Wahrheit (1922)
 Jenseits des Stromes (1922)
 Luise Millerin (1922) – Millerin
 Youth (1922)
 Power of Temptation (1922)
 Phantom (1922) – Baronin / Baroness
 Es leuchtet meine Liebe (1922) – Mutter von Saint Just
 Bigamy (1922)
 The False Dimitri (1922) – Amme Pawlowa
 Two Worlds (1922)
 Wem nie durch Liebe Leid geschah! (1922)
 The Big Shot (1922) – Frau Steinreich
 The Anthem of Love (1922)
 Tiefland (1923) – Die Duenna
 Nora (1923) – Marianne, Noras alte Amme
 The Treasure (1923) – Anna
 Friedrich Schiller (1923) – Elisabeth Dorothea, seine Frau
 The Woman on the Panther (1923)
 Die Fledermaus (1923) – Rosalindes Mutter
 Der Menschenfeind (1923)
 Der rote Reiter (1923)
 Resurrection (1923)
 Daisy (1923)
 Freund Ripp (1923)
 The Beautiful Girl (1923) – Frau Gött
 The Grand Duke's Finances (1924) – Augustine, die Köchin
 The Creature (1924)
 Mater dolorosa (1924)
 Kaddish (1924)
 Debit and Credit (1924) – Madame Sidonie Ehrenthal
 Gehetzte Menschen (1924) – Frau Garson
 Die Liebesbriefe einer Verlassenen (1924)
 Joyless Street (1925) – Frau Rosenow
 The Dice Game of Life (1925) – Emils Mutter
 The Elegant Bunch (1925) – Leos Mutter
 Secrets of a Soul (1926) – Die mutter
 Hello Caesar! (1927) – Frau Svoboda
 The Transformation of Dr. Bessel (1927) – Frau Regierer
 Family Gathering in the House of Prellstein (1927) – Seraphine
 Autumn on the Rhine (1928) – Frau Holm
 Dyckerpotts' Heirs (1928)
 The Three Kings (1928) – Landlady
 The Crimson Circle (1929) – Eine Vermieterin
 Zwischen vierzehn und siebzehn – Sexualnot der Jugend (1929)
 Melody of the Heart (1929) – Fräulein Czibulka
  (1932) – Frau Hasenklein
 Underground (1941) – Frau Franken
 Dangerously They Live (1941) – Mrs. Steiner
 Kings Row (1942) – Anna
 Friendly Enemies (1942) – Mrs. Pfeiffer
 Iceland (1942) – Aunt Sophie (uncredited)
 Desperate Journey (1942) – Frau Brahms
 Casablanca (1942) – Mrs. Leuchtag (uncredited)
 This Is the Army (1943) – Mrs. Twardofsky (uncredited)
 The Strange Death of Adolf Hitler (1943) – Middle-Class woman
 There's Something About a Soldier (1943) – Anna Grybinski (uncredited)
 Madame Curie (1943) – Seamstress (uncredited)
 Address Unknown (1944) – Grandma (uncredited)
 An American Romance (1944) – Mrs. Vronsky (uncredited)
 Murder in the Music Hall (1946) – Mom
 Rendezvous 24 (1946) – Frau Schmidt (uncredited)
 Temptation (1946) – Frau Mueller (uncredited)
 Repeat Performance (1947) – Mattie
 Desperate (1947) – Aunt Klara
 Letter from an Unknown Woman (1948) – Ticket-Taker (uncredited)
 Raw Deal (1948) – Fran – Oscar's Housekeeper (uncredited)
 A Foreign Affair (1948) – German Wife (uncredited)
 Words and Music (1948) – Mrs. Rogers
 Caught (1949) – Grandmother Rudetzki (uncredited)
 The Great Sinner (1949) – Pauline's Duenna (uncredited)
 Mr. Soft Touch (1949) – Old Woman (uncredited)
 Captain China (1950) – Mrs. Haasvelt
 Convicted (1950) – Martha Lorry (uncredited)
 Payment on Demand (1951) – Mrs. Polanski (uncredited)
 Passage West (1951) – Mama Ludwig
 '' (1953) – Frau Stransky (final film role)

References

External links

 
 
 
 

1876 births
1964 deaths
Austrian stage actresses
Austrian film actresses
Austrian silent film actresses
20th-century Austrian actresses
Jewish emigrants from Nazi Germany to the United States
Actresses from Vienna
Burials at Woodlawn Memorial Cemetery, Santa Monica